Freddie Lee Toliver  (born February 3, 1961), is former professional baseball pitcher. He played for the Minnesota Twins, Cincinnati Reds, Philadelphia Phillies, San Diego Padres, and Pittsburgh Pirates of Major League Baseball (MLB).

Freddie was selected by the New York Yankees in the 3rd round (77th overall) of the 1979 MLB June Amateur Draft out of San Gorgonio High School in San Bernardino, California.

External links
, or Retrosheet, or Pura Pelota (Venezuelan Winter League)

1961 births
Living people
African-American baseball players
American expatriate baseball players in Canada
American expatriate baseball players in Mexico
American expatriate baseball players in Taiwan
Baseball players from Mississippi
Buffalo Bisons (minor league) players
Carolina Mudcats players
Cedar Rapids Reds players
Cincinnati Reds players
Denver Zephyrs players
Edmonton Trappers players
Fort Lauderdale Yankees players
Greensboro Hornets players
Indianapolis Indians players
Las Vegas Stars (baseball) players
Leones de Yucatán players
Maine Guides players
Major League Baseball pitchers
Mexican League baseball pitchers
Minnesota Twins players
Navegantes del Magallanes players
American expatriate baseball players in Venezuela
Oneonta Yankees players
Palm Springs Angels players
Sportspeople from Natchez, Mississippi
Philadelphia Phillies players
Pittsburgh Pirates players
Rieleros de Aguascalientes players
Salinas Spurs players
San Diego Padres players
Tiburones de La Guaira players
Tigres de Aragua players
Tri-City Posse players
Wei Chuan Dragons players
Portland Beavers players
Wichita Aeros players
21st-century African-American people
20th-century African-American sportspeople